Merryfield Hall is a building located at 1600 Southwest Monroe Avenue on the Oregon State University campus in Corvallis, Oregon, United States.

References

Oregon State University buildings